Target Plaza South is a 33-story skyscraper in downtown Minneapolis, Minnesota completed in 2001. The building serves as the corporate headquarters for Target Corporation. It is located a few blocks away from the original building which the Target Corporation's predecessor, Dayton's, was located in from 1902 until 2001.

Description
The building was designed by architects Ellerbe Becket of Minneapolis and was completed in 2001.  It is connected via an eighth-floor walkway to the 14-story Target Plaza North and contains retail space on the street level with three levels of parking below ground. The building is notable for the colorful 3M-designed lighting display in its upper floors, which change frequently to present a unique light show that is visible in the Minneapolis skyline at night.

References 

Skyscraper office buildings in Minneapolis
Target Corporation
Office buildings completed in 2001
2001 establishments in Minnesota
Retail company headquarters in the United States